Sunxiuqinia elliptica is a Gram-negative, aerobic and elliptical bacterium from the genus of Sunxiuqinia which has been isolated from sediments from a seashore pond which was cultivatet with sea cucumbers from Jimo.

References

External links 
 microbewiki

Bacteroidia
Bacteria described in 2011